The London Irish Centre is a charity based in Camden, London, which has served the Irish community since 1955.

The charity originated in a fund established in 1954 by the Catholic Church (the Irish Priests Committee) to provide support for young Irish emigrants in London, and many of its staff in the early years were priests and other members of the Catholic Church. With a recession in Ireland in the mid-20th century, and Britain in need of workers in a number of industries and services, tens of thousands of Irish people migrated to Britain. The centre itself opened in 1955, providing accommodation (serving as a hostel in its early years), employment support and a starting point to those arriving. The Camden Square location was chosen for its proximity to Euston Station, where Irish people disembarked their trains from Holyhead Ferry Port. The London Irish Centre also became a hub of social activity, with dinners, dances and social functions. In its history, the centre has hosted visits from Presidents of Ireland Mary Robinson (in 1993) and Michael D. Higgins (in 2012).

The charity's focus remains in "providing assistance to Irish expatriates in London, whether they have been there for decades or have just arrived". In addition to the Camden Square site, the charity also has offices in West Kensington and Kilburn.

References

External links

Charities based in London
Buildings and structures in the London Borough of Camden
Social welfare charities based in the United Kingdom